Mallana (మల్లన్న) (15th century) was a Telugu poet and one of the Astadiggajas (literally means eight elephants) in the court of the king Krishnadevaraya.

Biography
He said that his birthplace was part of Rayalaseema (means land ruled by Rayas, Vijayanagara kings) in his works. He accompanied Krishnadevaraya in his military travels. He dedicated his work to Nadendla Appana (popularly known as Appaji), the governor of Kondavidu and nephew of a Minister called Saluava Timmana in the Vijayanagara Empire.

Works
His popular work is Rajasekara Charitram on the military and romantic conquests of Rajasekara, a king of Avanti.

Style 
Like other poets of Prabhanda (fiction) period, his story seems completely original and there is no Sanskrit equivalent to it.  Compared to his contemporaries, he is restrained in presenting romance.

References 

 Prabandha Telugu literature
 K.A. Nilakanta Sastry, History of South India, From Prehistoric times to fall of Vijayanagar, 1955, OUP, New Delhi (Reprinted 2002) 
 Golden age of Telugu Literature
 Literary activity in Vijayanagara Empire

Telugu poets
Year of birth unknown
Year of death unknown
15th-century Indian poets
Indian male poets
People from Rayalaseema
Poets from Andhra Pradesh
Vijayanagara poets